Methylobacterium thuringiense  is a Gram-negative, aerobic, facultatively methylotrophic and rod-shaped bacteria from the genus of Methylobacterium.

References

Further reading

External links
Type strain of Methylobacterium thuringiense at BacDive -  the Bacterial Diversity Metadatabase

Hyphomicrobiales
Bacteria described in 2013